Matheus Martins Silva dos Santos (born 16 July 2003), known as Matheus Martins, is a Brazilian professional footballer who plays as a forward for Watford, on loan from Udinese.

Career
On 1 July 2021, Martins signed a professional contract with Fluminense.

On 11 January 2023, Martins joined EFL Championship club Watford on loan from Udinese. He made his league debut on 14 January 2023 as a half time substitute in a 2-0 win against Blackpool and made his first start for the club in a 1-1 draw against Rotherham a week later.

Career statistics

Club

References

External links

2003 births
Living people
People from Campo Grande
Brazilian footballers
Association football forwards
Campeonato Brasileiro Série A players
Fluminense FC players
Brazil youth international footballers
Sportspeople from Mato Grosso do Sul
Udinese Calcio players
Brazilian expatriate footballers
Brazilian expatriate sportspeople in England
Brazilian expatriate sportspeople in Italy
Watford F.C. players